The Abram Hatch House is a historic residence in Heber City, Utah, United States, that is listed on the National Register of Historic Places (NRHP).

Description
The house is located at 81 East Center Street and was built c. 1892 by Abram Chase Hatch, a prominent Mormon community leader. The Victorian style house features a complex roofline with a small tower over the entrance and two projecting bays in the front framing a small porch, all with small gables superimposed on the hipped bays. The -story house is built of red sandstone with extensive wood detailing, including wood spindles on the front porch. The interior features extensive wood trim, glazed doors and windows with colored glass panes.

The house is arranged with a center hall, entered through a porch in the indentation between the projecting bays. A parlor and an office flank the entrance, followed by a sitting room and a dining room which have projecting bays to each side, then bedrooms and a kitchen. A small rear wing comprises service rooms. The upstairs features sleeping rooms on either side another center hall.

The Abram Hatch House was listed on the NRHP on October 10, 1975. After being threatened with demolition in the 1970s, the house was restored by Zions Bank and used as a branch bank.

See also

 National Register of Historic Places listings in Wasatch County, Utah

References

External links

 

Houses on the National Register of Historic Places in Utah
Victorian architecture in Utah
Houses completed in 1892
Houses in Wasatch County, Utah
Historic American Buildings Survey in Utah
Buildings and structures in Heber City, Utah
1892 establishments in Utah Territory
National Register of Historic Places in Wasatch County, Utah